Foreign Legal Consultants (Korean: 외국법자문사; Chinese: 外國法諮問士) are lawyers from foreign countries licensed to practice law in South Korea.

Qualification
Before becoming a Foreign Legal Consultant, a lawyer must:

 be admitted to the bar in a foreign jurisdiction,
 have at least three years of experience practicing law in that jurisdiction (one year of which may be spent working in South Korea), and
 show that reciprocity exists with their home jurisdiction, i.e. that a Japanese attorney could become similarly qualified to practice there (this condition is waived for lawyers admitted in WTO member states).

Footnotes

See also 
 Attorney at foreign law

Legal professions
Law of South Korea